Pano Archimandrita is a village in the Paphos District of Cyprus, located 12 km northeast of Kouklia.

References

Communities in Paphos District